Kherei (circa 433-410 BC, or circa 410-390 BC) was dynast of Lycia, ruler of the area of Xanthos, at a time when this part of Anatolia was subject to the Persian, or Achaemenid, Empire.

Present-day knowledge of Lycia in the period of classical antiquity comes mostly from archaeology, in which this region is unusually rich. He may have been the dynast to whom was dedicated the Xanthian Obelisk, where he is mentioned in multiple places, although this could more probably be his predecessor Kheriga (Xeriga, Gergis in Greek). Kherei may have been Kheriga's brother, and succeeded him.

Coinage
Kherei was among last the Lycian rulers to issue coinage. After 360 BC, the region of Lycia was taken over by the Carian dynast Mausolus.

The portrait on the coins of Kherei show the dynast wearing the Achaemenid satrapal headdress.

Notes

Further reading
 

Lycians
5th-century BC rulers
4th-century BC rulers
Rulers in the Achaemenid Empire